Hell House LLC II: The Abaddon Hotel is a 2018 American found-footage Horror mystery film written and directed by Stephen Cognetti. A sequel to the 2015 film Hell House LLC. its plot centers around a group of journalists who have gathered to explore the Abaddon Hotel, which has once again been abandoned following the events of the prior film.

The film was released on Shudder on September 20, 2018 and it received mixed reviews from critics.

Plot
The film begins with Wendy Mallet recounting her tragedy when her son, Jackson Mallet, broke into the abandoned Abaddon Hotel and never came out more than a year ago. A video is showed in which Jackson runs frantically around the hotel begging for help before having a mental breakdown. A cult follower is seen slowly approaching him.

On October 6, 2017, Suzy McCombs is presenting a Hell House LLC special program, with Arnold Tasselman, Mitchell Cavanaugh (Diane Graves' coworker from the first film) and Brock Davies as guests. They start discussing the veracity of the Hell House documentary. Arnold points out that he tried to take down Mitchell's documentary, arguing that it is a hoax that is causing damage to the town's reputation, while Mitchell reiterates that Diane and her cameraman died inside the hotel, and it is not a safe place to go. A journalism team from an online blog is watching the program. Its presenter, Jessica Fox, claims that with the help of Mitchell they can break into the Abaddon in hopes of a spike of popularity for their website.

They meet with Mitchell outside the Abaddon hotel, who says that breaking in will not be easy as the police is patrolling around the hotel to prevent any more disappearances, such as the one of a teenager who broke into the hotel and disappeared while livestreaming his adventure. On another video, a couple picks up a strange woman asking to be dropped off at the hotel, only to be revealed as the ghost of one of the tour-goers that died in the haunted attraction back in 2009.

Four days after their break-in, a distressed Jessica Fox is questioned by the Rockland County police. She cannot remember what happened and has a panic attack.

Mitchell, Jessica, Molly and David intend to break in, joined by Brock Davies and his cameraman Malcolm to investigate the hotel in a paranormal style. However, Molly cannot bring herself to enter and stays outside. Mitchell, Jessica and David head for the basement, while Brock and his cameraman go into the dining room where Andrew Tully, the hotel owner, committed suicide along with several cult followers of his satanic cult. When they try to communicate with Tully via a Ouija board, they see the ghost of a woman.

Molly enters the hotel at David's request. The group finds out that Alex from the original Hell House team went to the Abaddon in April 2009, way before the Hell House disaster. He is seen making a deal with an unseen man. When the group reunites with Molly and find out that David never asked her for help, they try to leave, only to be trapped inside. They begin to experience paranormal events including the ghost of Melissa, a Hell House actress that died in 2009, and the hanged bodies of Brock and his cameraman. They are then captured and sent to the dining room.

Back at the Morning Mysteries show, Mitchell claims that the hotel lures people inside in order to kill them and trap their souls there. Once the show ends, a crew member tells Suzy that Arnold Tasselman called to apologize as he could not make it to the interview. Suzy is shocked as "Tasselman" has just left after the show.

At the hotel, when Mitchell wakes up, he finds Jessica and Molly tied up, along with the ghostly figures of Mac and Alex, two of the original Hell House staff. Tully himself shows up, taunting Mitchell about how he lured him into the hotel despite Mitchell saying he would never enter it, revealing that "Tasselman" was Tully all along. Then, he sees the ghost of Diane playing the piano. Tully tells him that, in order for the dominoes to keep falling, he must choose one of them to walk out of the hotel to lure more people into it. Molly gets killed and Mitchell, having a breakdown, gets up. Jessica cries desperately for help.

In the present, Jessica is in the police station. When the officer questioning her turns around, it is revealed that she died inside the Abaddon as well, as we can see her ghost staring at the camera.

Cast
 Vasile Flutur as Mitchell Cavanaugh
 Jillian Geurts as Jessica Fox
 Joy Shatz as Molly Reynolds
 Dustin Austen as David Morris
 Brian David Tracy as Arnold Tasselman / Andrew Tully
 Kyle Ingleman as Brock Davies
 Amanda K. Morales as Suzy McCombs
 Laura Frenzer as Wendy Mallet
 Danny Bellini as Alex Taylor
 Tom Sibley as Jackson Mallet
 Lauren A. Kennedy as Melissa
 Adam Schneider as Andrew McNamara
 Alice Bahlke as Diane Graves
 Bailey Moyer as Hotel Guest
 Sean Hall as Amateur Videographer
 Matthew Binder as Amateur Videographer
 Gore Abrams as Paul O'keefe (archive footage)
 Alex Beechko as Andrea
 Jared Hacker as Tony Prescott (archive footage)
 Ryan Jennifer Jones as Sara Havel (archive footage)
 Joe Bandelli as Malcolm (uncredited)

Reception
Bloody Disgusting reviewed the film, criticizing it as a "well-intentioned misstep". On Culture Crypt the film has a review score of 35 out of 100 indicating "unfavorable reviews".

Sequel

Hell House LLC III: Lake of Fire was released as a Shudder exclusive on September 19, 2019. The film is styled as a documentary following Russell Wynn, a wealthy and mysterious entrepreneur who wants the Abaddon Hotel to serve as the location for an immersive theater experience called "Insomnia" based on Faust. Although aware of the location's history, he is keen to proceed with the venture despite others warning him of ongoing and frightening supernatural events. This prompts the documentary team to investigate Russell's past and the prior two events, uncovering new footage that implies Russell was involved with or was monitoring events. When opening night arrives chaos ensues, however Russell manages to wrestle Tully and overcome him before he can kill or take any other innocent lives. The following day one of the documentary crew muses that Russell was likely an angel sent back to defeat Tully and bring an end to his evil plans. Before the film ends, Russell manages to bring back the spirits of the original crew who died in the house, telling them that they are free from the evil but that the house still holds them captive.

Film School Rejects was critical of the movie, stating that it was "an ambitious stab at closing out a horror trilogy, but as much as that’s an accomplishment worth celebrating the end result is an unfortunate disappointment. Still, fans of the first two — or even the first one — might find some worthwhile closure in the final swan song of the Abaddon Hotel."

References

External links
 
 

2018 films
2010s mystery films
2018 horror films
Films set in hotels
Films shot in Pennsylvania
Found footage films
American horror films
2010s English-language films
2010s American films